Explosions in Kabul on September 5, 2016 killed over 41 people and injured 103 others in twin suicide bombings near the Afghan defense ministry. The Taliban claimed the first attack and said that their suicide bomber killed 58 people.   Reportedly an army general and one district police chief were killed in the blast. Attacks lasted overnight with a siege and hostage situation. At least one person was killed and six injured in another attack on a charity CARE International building in Shāre Naw. The attack was claimed by the Taliban, with at least 3 of their attackers being killed and 42 hostages being rescued.

The attacks come after another Taliban bombing only a few days before that killed two people and at least 6 militants.

See also
List of terrorist incidents in August 2016
July 2016 Kabul bombing
American University of Afghanistan attack
September 2018 Kabul attacks
List of terrorist attacks in Kabul

References

2016 murders in Afghanistan
Terrorist incidents in Kabul
Terrorist incidents in Afghanistan in 2016
Suicide bombings in Afghanistan
Mass murder in 2016
Mass murder in Kabul
Mass murder in Afghanistan
September 2016 crimes in Asia
2016 in Kabul
Military operations of the War in Afghanistan (2001–2021)
Attacks on buildings and structures in Afghanistan
Attacks in Afghanistan in 2016